Eugen Geiwitz (14 December 1901 – 14 April 1984) was a German fencer. He competed in the team épée event at the 1936 Summer Olympics.

References

1901 births
1984 deaths
German male fencers
Olympic fencers of Germany
Fencers at the 1936 Summer Olympics
20th-century German people